Barstow is an unincorporated community in Fresno County, California. The main street running through Barstow is West Barstow Avenue. It covers part of zipcode 93723, along with parts of Pratton, Herndon and Biola. This zipcode includes 36 businesses, 3028 single-family occupancies and a population of 9,724. The diversity index is 85 (on a scale from 0–100).

References

Unincorporated communities in California
Unincorporated communities in Fresno County, California